The Sântă Măria is a left tributary of the river Almaș in Romania. It flows into the Almaș in Sânmihaiu Almașului.

References

Rivers of Romania
Rivers of Sălaj County